Faiveley may refer to:

Faiveley Transport, rail transport equipment manufacturer
Domaine Faiveley, a wine producer